Bogumil Hrabak (Serbian Cyrillic: Богумил Храбак; Zrenjanin, Serbia, Kingdom of Serbs, Croats and Slovenes, 11 January 1927 - Belgrade, Serbia, 12 December 2010) was a Serbian historian, university professor and pedagogue. With a prolific and versatile career, he was considered "one of the last polyhistors of Yugoslav historiography."

He studied history from 1946 to 1951 at the University of Belgrade and later in Sarajevo, where he received his doctorate in 1957. He worked in Belgrade at the Faculty of Philosophy (1951-1957), the Military History Institute until 1958 and the Institute of Social Sciences until 1965, then at the Faculty of Philosophy in Priština, where he founded the Department of History, and from 1979 until his retirement in 1993 at the Faculty of Philosophy in Novi Sad. He was a full member of the Academy of Sciences and Arts of Kosovo (1978-1990). He was a historian of wide interests, who also dealt with various aspects of Serbo-Croatian history, especially foreign trade and diplomacy of the Republic of Dubrovnik.

Works
 Hercegovački dukatnici (1957)
 Export of cereals from the Ottoman Empire in the 14th, 15th and 16th centuries (1971), 
 Yugoslav prisoners in Italy and their volunteer question 1915–1918 (1980), 
 Wallachian and Uskok movements in northern Dalmatia in the 16th century (I – II, 1988) ), 
 Entente Powers and the United States of America towards Bulgaria 1915–1918 (1990), 
 Nikšić do početka XIX veka (1997)
 Prizren-Arbanasi League 1878–1881 (1998), 
 Podgorica until the beginning of the 19th century (2000), 
 Džemijet: organization of Muslims of Macedonia, Kosovo, Metohija and Sandžak 1919– 1928 (2003).
 Iz istorije prošlosti Bosne i Herzegovine, Book 3 (Arhivar, 2004)
 Jevreji u Beogradu (2009)

References 

1927 births
2010 deaths
People from Zrenjanin
People from Belgrade
20th-century Serbian historians
Yugoslav historians
University of Belgrade alumni
University of Sarajevo alumni
Academic staff of the University of Belgrade
Academic staff of the University of Pristina
Academic staff of the University of Novi Sad
21st-century Serbian historians